Existence values are a class of economic value, reflecting the benefit people receive from knowing that a particular environmental resource, such as Antarctica, the Grand Canyon, endangered species, or any other organism or thing exists. 

Existence value is a prominent example of non-use value, as they do not require that utility be derived from direct use of the resource: the utility comes from simply knowing the resource exists.  The idea was first introduced by John V. Krutilla in his essay "Conservation Reconsidered." 

As the Canadian Privy Council explains, existence value is "A concept used to refer to the intrinsic value of some asset, normally natural/environmental.  It is the value of the benefits derived from the asset's existence alone. For example, a tree can be valued in a number of ways, including its use value (as lumber), an existence value (simply being there), and an option value (value of things that it could be used for). Existence value is separate from the value accruing from any use or potential use of the asset."

These values are commonly measured through contingent valuation surveys and have been actionable damages in the US since . They were used in a legal assessment of damages following the Exxon Valdez oil spill.

See also
Ecosystem services
Value of Earth

References 

Environmental economics